Kromer or Krömer may refer to:

People
 Aaron Kromer, American football coach
 George "Stormy" Kromer, creator of the Stormy Kromer cap
 Kurt Krömer (born 1974), German television presenter, comedian and actor
 Leon Kromer, American soldier and football coach
 Marcin Kromer (1512–1589), Prince-Bishop of Warmia (Ermland), cartographer
 House of Kromer
 Tom Kromer (1906–1969), American writer

Other
 The Stormy Kromer Pursuit, 2-day cross-country skiing event
 A nonsense word for money used by the character Spamton in the video game Deltarune

See also 
 Cramer (disambiguation)
 Cromer
 Kramer (disambiguation)
 Franz Krommer
 Danish krone

German-language surnames